The Nimboran languages are a small family of Papuan languages, spoken in the Grime River watershed, that had been part of Stephen Wurm's Trans–New Guinea proposal. However, when proto-Nimboran pronouns are reconstructed (*genam "I" and kom or komot "thou"), they have little resemblance to the proto-TNG pronouns *na and *ga. Usher places them in a North Papuan stock that resembles Cowan's proposal.

Foley (2018) classifies the Nimboran languages separately as an independent language family.

Classification
The languages are:
Nimboran (Grime River)
East
Mekwei (Moi)
Gresi–Kemtuik
Kemtuik
Gresi
West
Mlap (Kuangsu)
Namblong (Nimboran)

Proto-language

Pronouns
The pronouns Ross (2005) reconstructs for proto-Nimboran are,

{| class=wikitable
|-
| I || *genam 
|-
| thou || *kom, komot 
|-
| s/he || ?
|}

Below are pronouns in the Nimboran languages as given by Foley (2018):

{| 
|+ Nimboran pronouns
!  !! Nimboran !! Kemtuik !! Gresi !! Mlap !! Mekwei
|-
! 1excl
| ngo || gənam || ganam || ngam || kə ~ kat
|-
! 1incl
| yo || imot ||  || 
|-
! 2
| ko || mot || ko || kom || kmot
|-
! 3
| no || nemot ||  || 
|}

As in Kaure, pronouns are not specified for number in the Nimboran language.

Basic vocabulary
Some lexical reconstructions by Usher (2020) are:

{| class="wikitable sortable"
! gloss !! Proto-Grime River
|-
| head || *jaŋkaMBʉ
|-
| leaf/head hair || *ndɜp
|-
| ear || *kam[a/ɔ]; *kəni[n/ŋ]
|-
| eye || *namuɔ
|-
| tooth || *səɺiŋ; *wasəɺa[ŋ]
|-
| tongue || *anəmbəɺ[i/ɛ]ŋ; *mambəɺ[ɜ/ɔ]p
|-
| foot/leg || *masi
|-
| blood/red || *kin
|-
| seed/bone || *ndɜn
|-
| skin/bark || *asu[p/k]
|-
| breast/milk || *min
|-
| louse || *səna[ŋ]
|-
| dog || *unduɔ
|-
| pig || *inəmbuɔ
|-
| bird || *jʉ
|-
| egg || *səwip[i]
|-
| tree/wood || *ndi
|-
| man/male || *səɺu
|-
| woman || *kambuŋ; *ki
|-
| sun || *wɔj
|-
| moon || *mbanu
|-
| water/river || *mbu
|-
| fire || *kip; *kɜj
|-
| stone || *ndəmuɔ
|-
| path || *tap
|-
| name || *sʉ
|-
| eat || *ndam
|-
| one || *kapəɺaj[a]
|-
| two || *namuan
|}

Vocabulary comparison
The following basic vocabulary words are from Voorhoeve (1975), as cited in the Trans-New Guinea database:

{| class="wikitable sortable"
! gloss !! Gresi !! Kemtuik !! Mekwei !! Mlap !! Nimboran
|-
! head
| yaŋkabu || iŋkabu || yekembu || yaŋkambu || iŋgiambu
|-
! hair
| bətə-dop || dop || bəterep || məndü-pra || mendü-pro
|-
! eye
| nam || nmu-tugon || namo-den || nuŋgroŋ || nuŋgroŋ
|-
! tooth
| səriŋ || wasraŋ || siŋyaŋ || səriŋ-dowŋ || hriŋ-douŋ
|-
! leg
| masi || masi || masi || mesi || mesi
|-
! louse
| səna || səne || səne || səne || hnaŋ
|-
! dog
| udo || udo || ando || undo || unduo
|-
! pig
| nəmbu || nəmbo || mbo || ibo || ibwo
|-
! bird
| iü || iü || ü || iü || iü
|-
! egg
| si || si || səbi || süp || süp
|-
! blood
| kiŋ || kiŋ || kiŋ || kiŋ || kiŋ
|-
! bone
| don || don || den || dowŋ || douŋ
|-
! skin
| suk || saisuk || asuk || sup || sub
|-
! tree
| di || di || di || di || di-tim
|-
! man
| sərə || səruə || si || sru || hru
|-
! sun
| woy || woy || woy || woy || uai
|-
! water
| bu || bu || bu || bu || bu
|-
! fire
| koy || koy || kei-sini || kip || kip
|-
! stone
| dom || dəmu || dəmo || dəmu || demue
|-
! name
| sü || siü || siu || sü || sü
|-
! eat
| dam || dam || anime || dam || dam
|-
! one
| kray || kraya || kapray || tendu || tendü
|-
! two
| namon || namon || naman || namoŋ || namuan
|}

References

External links
Nimboran word lists from Voorhoeve (1975) (TransNewGuinea.org)
Grime River. New Guinea World.

 
Foja Range languages